Jaltomata lojae is a plant species native to Peru and Ecuador.

Jaltomata lojae is a perennial shrub. Flowers are white with green spots near the center. Fruits are orange at maturity.

References

lojae
Flora of Peru
Flora of Ecuador